Eiheiji Dam is a gravity dam located in Fukui Prefecture in Japan. The dam is used for flood control and water supply. The catchment area of the dam is 3.1 km2. The dam impounds about 4  ha of land when full and can store 770 thousand cubic meters of water. The construction of the dam was started on 1991 and completed in 2001.

References

Dams in Fukui Prefecture
2001 establishments in Japan